Michael Mmoh (born January 10, 1998) is a Saudi-born American tennis player. 
Mmoh has a career-high ATP singles ranking of No. 82 achieved on 20 February 2023. He has won 7 ATP Challenger titles and 4 ITF Futures tournaments, including his first at the age of 16.
He won the USTA junior national championship in 2016.

Personal life

Born in Saudi Arabia, where he lived until the age of 13, Mmoh has both Irish and Nigerian ancestry. Michael's father Tony Mmoh was also a professional tennis player who represented Nigeria and reached a career-high ranking of 105. His mother was born in Ireland and is also an Australian citizen. Mmoh's parents named him after basketball superstar Michael Jordan. 

Mmoh began playing tennis at age 3. He trains at the IMG Academy in Florida.

Junior career
Mmoh peaked in the Boy's Junior rankings at No. 2 after reaching the semifinals at the 2015 Junior French Open. He won the 2016 USTA 18s Boys' National Championship to earn a wild card into the main draw of the US Open.

Professional career

Early career
Mmoh has enjoyed some early success on the ITF Futures tour, winning three titles before turning 18.

2016–2017: ATP, Grand Slam and top 200 debut
In February 2016, Mmoh qualified for his first ATP-level tournament at Memphis by defeating fellow Americans Dennis Novikov and Bjorn Fratangelo. He then lost in the first round to eventual finalist Taylor Fritz, the highest ranked American teenager at the time. Following his fourth Futures title, Mmoh was awarded a wildcard into the Miami Masters, where he lost to Alexander Zverev, the top-ranked 18 year-old in the world, after dropping two tiebreaks.

In September 2016, Mmoh broke into the top 300 for the first time by reaching the final of the ATP Challenger event at Tiburon as a qualifier. 

In November 2016, he reached the Top 200 and also won the 2017 Australian Open Wild Card Challenge largely by claiming his first career Challenger title at Knoxville. 
He would claim another Challenger title the following summer in August 2017 at Lexington.

2018: Top 100, First ATP wins & quarterfinals, Masters third round 
To start off the 2018 season, Mmoh recorded his first career ATP-level match wins by defeating Federico Delbonis in the first round of the Brisbane International and world No. 33 Mischa Zverev to make the quarterfinals, where he lost to Alex de Minaur. 

At the 2018 Miami Open he reached the third round as a qualifier for the first time at a Masters level defeating 12th seed Roberto Bautista Agut for his first top-15 win and the biggest of his career.

He entered the main draw at the 2018 Wimbledon Championships for the first time at this Grand Slam as a lucky loser. He reached the top 100 at World No. 97 on 1 October 2018.

2019–20: First Grand Slam win
In January 2019, Mmoh qualified for the first time via ranking in a Grand Slam main draw at the 2019 Australian Open where he lost in the first round to Radu Albot. 

At the 2020 Australian Open, Mmoh recorded his first main draw victory with a straight sets win over Pablo Andújar as a wildcard. Following his Australian Open performance, Mmoh qualified for the main draw at the 2020 US Open, where he won his first round match against João Sousa in four sets, and also at the 2020 French Open, where he lost in the first round.

2021–22: ATP quarterfinal, Out of top 250
At the 2021 Australian Open he reached again the second round in a five set stunning comeback against Viktor Troicki but lost to second seed Rafael Nadal in the next round. He received a wildcard for the 2021 Miami Open.

In 2022, he won a wildcard entry into the main draw at the 2022 French Open by winning the Roland Garros wildcard challenge.

2023: Australian Open third round, fourth ATP quarterfinal, top 85
Mmoh's first tournament of the year was in Pune, where he defeated local wildcard Manas Dhamne in the first round before losing to the 6th seed, Filip Krajinović in the second round.

He then entered the 2023 Australian Open as a lucky loser after the withdrawal of David Goffin and won his first round match, defeating fellow qualifier French Laurent Lokoli, after saving a match point in the third set. He then defeated 12th seed Alexander Zverev in the second round. He became the fifth player to make it as a lucky loser to the third round; the furthest a lucky loser had made it at this Major is the fourth round (Stéphane Robert in 2014). As a result he moved up 25 positions back into the top 100 to a new career-high singles ranking of No. 83 on 30
January 2023.

In February, he lost in the first round at the Dallas Open to eventual champion Yibing Wu. The following week, he reached the round of 16 at the Delray Beach Open by defeating wildcard Aleksandar Kovacevic in three sets. Next he reached the quarterfinals after upsetting third seed Denis Shapovalov, also in three sets. As a result he reached a new career high ranking in the top 85.

Singles performance timeline

Current through the 2023 Abierto Mexicano Telcel.

ATP Challenger and ITF Futures finals

Singles: 17 (11–6)

Doubles: 1 (1–0)

References

External links
 
 

1998 births
Living people
American male tennis players
Tennis people from Florida
American people of Irish descent
American sportspeople of Nigerian descent